Cinema Bizarre was a German glam rock band from Berlin. They released their debut album in 2007. Their manager was Lacrimosa singer and songwriter Tilo Wolff. In January 2010, the band announced that they were taking a break.

Cinema Bizarre has sold more than 1.5 million records worldwide.

Members

Strify (Andreas Eduard Hudec) (born 20 August 1988) – vocals
Kiro (Carsten Carl Schaefer) (born 11 January 1988) – bass
Yu (Hannes de Buhr) (born 29 December 1988) – guitar
Shin (Marcel Gothow) (born 12 December 1989) – drums
Luminor (Lars Falkowsky) (born 22 March 1985 – died 12 April 2020) – keyboard and backing vocals
Romeo (Tobias Kohl) (born 4 August 1988) – keyboard

History
Their first single CD "Lovesongs (They Kill Me)" was released on 14 September 2007, two weeks after their first live performance in the German music show The Dome. The Norddeutscher Rundfunk (North German television broadcast) nominated the band for the national final of the Eurovision Song Contest 2008. No Angels and Carolin Fortenbacher, made it into the second election round of the final, leaving Cinema Bizarre behind.

They released their first studio album, Final Attraction, in 2007. This is the only album to feature keyboardist and backing vocalist Luminor. Three singles were released from the album: "Lovesongs (They Kill Me)", "Escape to the Stars", and "Forever or Never". The album was released in several European countries.

On 28 March 2008, they began their first tour throughout Europe. In September 2008 Luminor took a break from going on tour with the band. It was announced that his health was poor and he needed time off in order to get better. While he was on break, Yu's close friend traveled and played with the band.

On 1 November 2008, a trailer was released which stated the name of Cinema Bizarre's second album to be Toyz.

On 27 November 2008, Luminor announced that he was leaving the band. Romeo, a friend of Yu, eventually took his place as keyboardist for the band.

In 2009, Cinema Bizarre toured through North America as opening act for Lady GaGa on her The Fame Ball Tour.

Initially, the first single who the note and the basic compose was done by Mattia Rissone TIA, from their new album was to be "My Obsession", Strify described to be a 'powerful ballad'. However, the single was leaked, and thus was pulled off the Internet. The album release date was also pushed back from May to 21 August. "My Obsession", although it already had cover art, was not released. The band released a message on their official YouTube account expressing their disappointment, and that they would change the single. On their official website, they announced that their American album was going to be titled "Bang!". The first single from the albums ToyZ and BANG! was "I Came 2 Party", a duet with Space Cowboy (musician).

"My Obsession" was chosen to be the second single from Toyz and BANG! and was accompanied by two different versions of the music video. Due to the lack of further promotion, the song failed entering the German music charts.

In 2009 Cinema Bizarre won an EBBA Award. Every year the European Border Breakers Awards (EBBA) recognize the success of ten emerging artists or groups who reached audiences outside their own countries with their first internationally released album in the past year.

On 21 January 2010 the band announced via MySpace that they were taking a break, as they felt that it was "time to start something new."

Post-Cinema Bizarre
Strify started going by his full name, Jack Strify, and released a new version of their song "Blasphemy" as a featured artist with French DJ Junior Caldera in June 2011. He later announced that he would be releasing a solo album. In 2012, three music videos have been published on his YouTube channel as a trilogy entitled "GLITTER + DIRT", including the songs "Brave New World", "Sanctuary" and "HALO (We're The Only One)" which were eventually released on his first EP Glitter + Dirt in August 2013.
On 1 August 2014 he announced the name of his first album to be called ILLUSION and launched a crowdfunding campaign to finish the album. Teasers were posted throughout the campaign and on 30 November 2014 his album was released through the crowdfunding partner PledgeMusic.
The album was released through Membran Music worldwide on 24 April 2015, proceeded by the digital single release "Burn/Fear" and "Lovers When It's Cold" on 2 April 2015.

On 11 November 2011, Yu Phoenix (guitarist) released a new single on iTunes named "Moonflower" which features J'Lostein. Later on, in January 2012 he announced a new band project with Sebastiano Serafini called "Monochrome Hearts" in collaboration with Mattia Rissone TIA Composer. A preview for the first single has been released on their YouTube Channel. In January 2013, Monochrome Hearts debuted their first full single, Your Knight, on iTunes and amazon.  The second single, When the Night Kills the Day was released on Amazon and iTunes on 13 July 2013. In October 2013, Yu Phoenix also joined the band DNR (Dreams Not Reality) band Managed by Mattia Rissone in 2011 til 2013 as the new guitarist. Yu Phoenix has a Twitch community located at http://www.Twitch.tv/YuPhoenix where he talks to his supporters almost daily. In early 2018 Yu Phoenix released that he was starting a new project entitled Everyze with singer David Baßin from the metal band Victorius. In the fall of 2018 Yu Phoenix embarked on an adventure that took him from Dubai to the west coast of the United States and back across the globe to Japan for game influenced networking.

Luminor's departure
From September onwards, Luminor had been absent at a few concerts and Yu's closest friend, Romeo, temporarily helped out in Luminor's place. On 27 November 2008 Luminor announced on his MySpace profile that he had to leave Cinema Bizarre. He said this departure was due to health issues and unresolvable inner conflicts. In his statement, he briefly said that his condition had worsened, he was not able to continue participating in the band, and it was a private issue. Eventually, Romeo permanently took over for Luminor as keyboardist.

Luminor came back to the stage in 2010 with the Italian band DNR (Dreams Not Reality) for a featuring during their European tour, and again in 2013 together with the Italian singer Roberto Romagnoli.

Luminor passed away in April 2020.

Discography

Albums

1: released only in Canada and the U.S.

Singles

References

External links

2005 establishments in Germany
Musical groups established in 2005
Musical groups from Berlin
German alternative rock groups
German indie rock groups
German pop music groups
German synthpop groups
German glam rock musical groups